Una-Mary Parker (née Nepean-Gubbins; 30 March 1930 – 11 April 2019) was an English journalist and novelist.

Family
Parker was the daughter of Hugh Power Nepean-Gubbins, a businessman, and his wife, Laura. She was a cousin of the Duchess of Cornwall. She married photographer Archie Parker on 6 October 1951 with whom she had two children. She and her husband, a royal photographer, were a high society couple of the 1960s and 1970s, and regularly made headlines with their couture clothes.

Journalism and fiction
In addition to working as a journalist for the Daily Mail and Evening Standard, she also spent ten years as social editor of the British magazine, The Tatler.

Parker's first novel, Riches, appeared in October 1987 and has since been widely read internationally. Her novels include Scandals (1988), Temptations (1989), Veil of Secrets (1990), Enticements (1990),The Palace Affair (1992), Forbidden Feelings (1993), Only the Best (1993), A Guilty Pleasure (1994), False Promises (1995), Taking Control (1996), A Dangerous Desire (1997), Dark Passions (1998), Secrets of the Night (1998), Broken Trust (1999), Sweet Vengeance (2000), Moment of Madness (2001), Alexia's Secret (2008)

Later life
In 2016, Parker revealed that she was suffering from glaucoma. She died on 11 April 2019, aged 89.

References

1930 births
2019 deaths
20th-century British novelists
20th-century British women writers
British women journalists
British women novelists
English people of Scottish descent
English people of Irish descent
Daily Mail journalists
London Evening Standard people